Oberea rubetra is a species of beetle in the family Cerambycidae. It was described by Francis Polkinghorne Pascoe in 1858. It is known from Sumatra, Borneo and Malaysia.

Subspecies
 Oberea rubetra sikkimana Breuning, 1982
 Oberea rubetra rubetra Pascoe, 1858

References

Beetles described in 1858
rubetra